Four Lane Ends is a Tyne and Wear Metro station, serving the suburbs of Benton and Longbenton, North Tyneside in Tyne and Wear, England. It joined the network on 11 August 1980, following the opening of the first phase of the network, between Haymarket and Tynemouth via Four Lane Ends.

History
The station is located at the junction of Benton Lane (A188), Benton Park Road (A191) and Front Street (A191). The crossroads has historically been important for traders, cattle drivers, and those transporting local salts and lime towards the shipyards and factories in Newcastle. Nearby employment sites include Benton Park View to the west, Tyneview Park to the south east, and Quorum Business Park to the north.

Unlike neighbouring Longbenton and Benton, Four Lane Ends was purpose-built for the Tyne and Wear Metro network. These purpose-built stations, such as Four Lane Ends, Heworth and Regent Centre, had a definite corporate look of rectangular blocks, light enamelled wall panels, and black roofing.

The station is situated at the site of the first Longbenton station, which opened in 1864 and closed at the start of 1871 – being replaced by Benton. The last remains of this station disappeared following the construction of Four Lane Ends in the late 1970s. 

Four Lane Ends houses two art installations, both of which were commissioned in the early 2000s. Andrew Stonyer's Pulse (2000) features in the station's courtyard, adjacent to the ticket concourse, and consists of a  diameter corten steel ring, with a circle of bright neon red. Cath Campbell's Detour (2003) features on the south and west elevations of the station's multi-storey car park, creating an "animated" and "dynamic" surface, describing movement and journeys through space.

Facilities 
Step-free access is available at all stations across the Tyne and Wear Metro network, with two lifts providing step-free access to platforms at Four Lane Ends. As part of the Metro: All Change programme, new lifts were installed at Four Lane Ends in 2012, with new escalators installed in 2015. The station is equipped with ticket machines, seating, next train information displays, timetable posters, and an emergency help point on both platforms. Ticket machines are able to accept payment with credit and debit card (including contactless payment), notes and coins. The station is also fitted with smartcard validators, which feature at all stations across the network. The station houses a small number of shops and services. A Nexus TravelShop also operated at the station until 2014.

A large multi-storey pay and display car park is available, with 457 spaces plus 22 accessible spaces, as well as a taxi rank. There is also the provision for cycle parking, with five cycle pods, five cycle lockers, and 18 cycle spaces available for use. A bus interchange is also available at the station, providing frequent connections in and around Newcastle upon Tyne and North Tyneside.

Services 
, the station is served by up to five trains per hour on weekdays and Saturday, and up to four trains per hour during the evening and on Sunday.

Rolling stock used: Class 599 Metrocar

Bus Station 

The bus station is located above the Tyne and Wear Metro station. It is served by Arriva North East, Go North East and Stagecoach in Newcastle's local bus services, with frequent routes serving Newcastle upon Tyne and North Tyneside. The bus station has seven departure stands (lettered A–G), each of which is fitted with seating, next bus information displays, and timetable posters. The interchange was redeveloped in 2004, to include a 475 space multi-storey car park, as well as improved passenger facilities.

References

External links
 
 Timetable and station information for Four Lane Ends

Metropolitan Borough of North Tyneside
1980 establishments in England
Railway stations in Great Britain opened in 1980
Tyne and Wear Metro Yellow line stations
Transport in Tyne and Wear
Bus stations in Tyne and Wear